Cypriot Futsal First Division is the top tier futsal league in Cyprus. It was founded in 1999 and is organized by Cyprus Football Association. The competition is played under UEFA and FIFA rules, currently consists of 11 teams.

Champions

Performance by club

External links
futsalplanet.com

Futsal competitions in Cyprus
Cyprus
futsal
1999 establishments in Cyprus
Sports leagues established in 1999